Sperm-associated antigen 1 is a protein that in humans is encoded by the SPAG1 gene.

Function 

The correlation of anti-sperm antibodies with cases of unexplained infertility implicates a role for these antibodies in blocking fertilization. Improved diagnosis and treatment of immunologic infertility, as well as identification of proteins for targeted contraception, are dependent on the identification and characterization of relevant sperm antigens. 

The protein expressed by this gene is recognized by anti-sperm agglutinating antibodies from an infertile woman. Furthermore, immunization of female rats with the recombinant human protein reduced fertility. This protein localizes to the plasma membrane of germ cells in the testis and to the post-acrosomal plasma membrane of mature spermatozoa. 

Recombinant polypeptide binds GTP and exhibits GTPase activity. Thus, this protein may regulate GTP signal transduction pathways involved in spermatogenesis and fertilization. Two transcript variants of this gene encode the same protein.

References

Further reading